Ivica Kralj (born 26 March 1973) is a Montenegrin former footballer who played as a goalkeeper.

During his playing career, Kralj was best known for his time at Partizan, having three spells at the club and winning five major trophies. He also played for Porto and PSV.

At international level, Kralj represented FR Yugoslavia at the 1998 FIFA World Cup and UEFA Euro 2000, reaching the knockout stage in both tournaments.

Club career

Partizan
Born in Kotor and raised in Tivat, Kralj started out at his local club Arsenal Tivat, before joining Partizan as a trainee in the summer of 1987. He broke into their first team at the age of 16, sitting on the bench during a 5–4 away loss to Celtic in the second leg of the European Cup Winners' Cup first round on 27 September 1989. In order to gain experience, Kralj was later sent out on loan to Zvezdara (1992–93) and Jastrebac Niš (1993–94), before returning to Partizan. He made his league debut for the club in the 1995–96 season, as they won the championship title. In the 1996–97 campaign, Partizan won their second consecutive title, as Kralj became the club's undisputed first-choice goalkeeper and earned his first national team cap. He also won the FR Yugoslavia Cup in the 1997–98 season, before going abroad.

Porto
In the summer of 1998, Kralj moved to Portugal and signed with Porto. He initially established himself as the club's first-choice goalkeeper, helping them win the Supertaça on 9 September 1998. However, following Vítor Baía's return to Porto in the 1999 winter transfer window, Kralj completely lost his place in the starting lineup. He was subsequently loaned to Radnički Kragujevac until the end of the 1998–99 season.

PSV
In the 1999 summer transfer window, Kralj was transferred to Dutch club PSV. He featured in the UEFA Champions League of that year where PSV suffered a 4–1 defeat to Rangers in the group stage. Shortly after, Kralj suffered a hamstring injury, ruling him out for five months. He returned to action in April 2000, but was mainly a backup to Ronald Waterreus and Patrick Lodewijks, as the club convincingly won the domestic league in his debut season at Philips Stadion. After failing to make any appearances in the first half of the 2000–01 season, Kralj was loaned to his former club Partizan in January 2001. He added one more national cup trophy to his collection, despite not getting any game time in the competition. After returning to PSV, Kralj was the club's third-choice goalkeeper behind Waterreus and Lodewijks. He eventually left the club by mutual consent in 2002.

Return to Partizan
In June 2003, Kralj made another return to Partizan, signing a one-year deal. He quickly found his form and helped the team qualify for the Champions League in the 2003–04 campaign, saving two penalties in the shootout against Newcastle United at St James' Park in the final qualifying round. However, Kralj failed to make any appearances in the group stage due to an injury. He eventually signed a three-year extension to his contract with Partizan in May 2004. After recovering from injury, Kralj was a first team regular, helping his team win the league title in 2005, with an unbeaten record. He left the club at the end of his contract, stating his disappointment towards some members of the club's board.

Rostov
In August 2007, Kralj moved to Russia as a free agent and signed with Rostov. He was joined by his former teammate Albert Nađ. However, Kralj failed to make any competitive appearance for the club, as they suffered relegation from the top flight after finishing bottom of the table. He was released by Rostov in December 2007, alongside Nađ and several other players.

Spartak Trnava
In July 2008, Kralj moved to Slovak club Spartak Trnava, signed by his former manager Vladimir Vermezović, on a two-year deal. He agreed to leave the club in late 2009, due to his chronic injury problems, eventually retiring from the game.

International career
Kralj made his international debut for FR Yugoslavia on 28 December 1996, coming on as a late second-half substitute for Zvonko Milojević in a 3–2 friendly win away to Argentina. He subsequently became the first-choice goalkeeper for the national team under Slobodan Santrač, helping them to qualify for the 1998 FIFA World Cup. In the final tournament, Kralj played the full 90 minutes in all of his team's four games, as they were eliminated by the Netherlands in the knockout stage.

Despite not playing regularly at club level, Kralj was named by Vujadin Boškov in Yugoslavia's final UEFA Euro 2000 squad, choosing the number 22 shirt. They went on to reach the quarter-finals of the competition, where the team was eliminated by the Netherlands. The hosts achieved a convincing 6–1 victory, including a hat-trick by Patrick Kluivert and a brace by Marc Overmars.

In June 2001, after a one-year absence from the national team, Kralj was selected to represent his country at the Kirin Cup. He made his last appearance for FR Yugoslavia in a 1–1 home draw with Slovenia on 5 September 2001, as the country failed to qualify for the 2002 FIFA World Cup. Over a five-year international career, Kralj earned 41 caps for Yugoslavia.

Post-playing career
After hanging up his boots, Kralj worked for some time as a player agent. He was appointed as president of Mačva Šabac in January 2015. In November 2020, after spending five and a half years in charge, Kralj stepped down from his position.

In September 2022, Kralj was appointed as sporting director of Partizan.

Career statistics

Club

International

Honours
Partizan
 First League of FR Yugoslavia: 1995–96, 1996–97, 2004–05
 FR Yugoslavia Cup: 1997–98, 2000–01
Porto
 Supertaça Cândido de Oliveira: 1998
PSV
 Eredivisie: 1999–2000, 2001–02
 Johan Cruyff Shield: 2000, 2001

References

External links

 
 
 
 

1973 births
Living people
People from Kotor
People from Tivat
Serbs of Montenegro
Yugoslav footballers
Serbia and Montenegro footballers
Montenegrin footballers
Serbian footballers
Association football goalkeepers
Serbia and Montenegro international footballers
1998 FIFA World Cup players
UEFA Euro 2000 players
FK Partizan players
FK Zvezdara players
FK Jastrebac Niš players
FC Porto players
FK Radnički 1923 players
PSV Eindhoven players
FC Rostov players
FC Spartak Trnava players
First League of Serbia and Montenegro players
Primeira Liga players
Eredivisie players
Serbian SuperLiga players
Russian Premier League players
Slovak Super Liga players
Serbia and Montenegro expatriate footballers
Montenegrin expatriate footballers
Expatriate footballers in Portugal
Expatriate footballers in the Netherlands
Expatriate footballers in Russia
Expatriate footballers in Slovakia
Serbia and Montenegro expatriate sportspeople in the Netherlands
Montenegrin expatriate sportspeople in Russia
Montenegrin expatriate sportspeople in Slovakia
Serbian sports agents
Serbian football chairmen and investors
FK Partizan non-playing staff
Serbia and Montenegro expatriate sportspeople in Portugal